T39 may refer to:

1964 T-39 shootdown incident in 1964, when an unarmed USAF T-39 Sabreliner was shot down over East Germany by a Soviet MiG-19 fighter aircraft
Cooper T39, a sportscar designed by Owen Maddock and John Cooper
Ericsson T39, GSM mobile phone released by Ericsson Mobile Communications in 2001
Guerchais-Roche T-39 and Guerchais-Roche T.35, low-wing touring monoplanes with fixed undercarriage
HMSAS Parktown (T39), minesweeping whaler of the South African Naval Services that was sunk during the Second World War
North American T-39 Sabreliner, a mid-sized business jet developed by North American Aviation